F400, F.400 or F-400 may refer to :
 ESP F-400, an ESP Guitars model
 Farman F.400, a 1934 French three-seat cabin aircraft
 Ferrari 400, a 1976 sports car
 Goliath F400, a 1933 three-wheeler freight truck